Ya ba (literally 'crazy medicine'), formerly known as yama (literally 'horse drug'), also known as "bikers' coffee" and "kamikaze", are tablets containing a mixture of methamphetamine and caffeine. This drug combination has been widely used illicitly, especially in Southeast Asian nations.

Alternative names
From ya khayan ('hard-working pill') in its early days to ya maa ('horse medicine'), the drug was named ya ba ('crazy pill') in 1996. It was given to horses when pulling carts up steep hills and for other strenuous work in Shan State in Myanmar (formerly Burma). The slang terms for ya ba in Burma are kyethi (literally, 'button'), athi, and palarkar.

In Malaysia, ya ba is known in Malay as pil kuda (literally, 'horse pill'). It is commonly found in the state of Kelantan, on the border with Thailand. The name commonly used for it in the Philippines and Indonesia is shabú. In north Thailand it is often referred to as chocalee due to the somewhat sweet taste ya ba leaves in the mouth and its strong chocolate smell. The name commonly used for it in China is ma-goo or ma-guo. In Bangladesh, it is colloquially known as baba, guti, laal, khawon, ‘jinish ’, stuff or maal. Ya ba is sometimes called bhul bhuliya in India.

Appearance and use
Ya ba is typically produced in a round pill form. There are many different versions of ya ba, and the most common are red, pink, orange, or lime green in color and carry logos such as "R" or "WY".

Ya ba tablets typically are consumed orally. Users also place the ya ba tablet on aluminum foil and heat it from below. As the tablet melts, vapors rise and are inhaled ("chasing the dragon"). The drug also may be administered by crushing the tablets into powder, which is then snorted or mixed with a solvent and injected. When swallowed in pill form the duration of the drug's effect is 8–16 hours, as compared to 1–3 hours when smoked, while the intensity is considerably reduced. The peak of the drug's effect is followed by a comedown period lasting 6–10 hours, during which the user may have difficulty sleeping or eating. Many users report that it takes them up to 24 hours after consumption to be able to fall asleep.

Ya ba is not commonly injected as many intravenous users prefer the pure product instead (methamphetamine, called "ice" in Southeast Asia). This illegal drug is especially popular in Thailand, where it is imported from Burma or Laos even though it is sometimes manufactured locally in Thailand.

Typical ya ba users are working males, aged 16–40 years old. Its use is also not uncommon among both female and male sex workers in Thailand and Cambodia.

Suppliers
Burma (Myanmar) is the largest producer of methamphetamine in the world, with the majority of ya ba found in Thailand being produced in Burma, particularly in the Golden Triangle and northeastern Shan State, which borders Thailand, Laos, and China. In 2010, Burma trafficked 1 billion tablets to neighbouring Thailand. Ethnic militias and rebel groups (in particular the United Wa State Army) are responsible for much of this production; however, the Burmese military units are believed to be heavily involved in the trafficking of the drugs.

Ya ba use around the world

Rise and fall in popularity in Thailand
Ya ba tablets were formerly sold legally at gas stations and used by long-haul drivers to stay awake. The drug was outlawed by the Thai government in 1970.

Law enforcement officials said that as of 2002, most of the drug was produced by the United Wa State Army in Myanmar. It was smuggled from Myanmar across the porous border into Thailand. In 2014, it was reported that Thailand's northeast provinces have seen a 700 percent increase in the number of people arrested for meth since 2008, according to data from the Narcotics Suppression Bureau. In 2013, authorities counted more than 33,000 meth-related arrests in the northeast. The rapid growth of ya ba use in Isan mirrors that which occurred across Asia, which by 2014 accounted for more than 50 percent of global amphetamine-type stimulant users.

On 16 June 2016, the National Council for Peace and Order, the military junta ruling Thailand, stated that it was planning to decriminalise ya ba.

Bangladesh
In 2006, ya ba consumption became common for the poor. Although the extent of ya ba abuse in Bangladesh is not precisely known, seizures of the drug by authorities are frequent. It is also believed those who use it on a regular basis are frequently involved in the distribution of the drug, either directly or indirectly.

Some Burmese Rohingya refugees are hired by drug dealers to smuggle ya ba from Myanmar into Bangladesh. In 2016, 359 illegal Burmese were arrested on ya ba-smuggling charges, and up to US$29 million worth of ya ba was seized by the Bangladeshi authorities.

In October 2018 Bangladesh government drafted a law which punishes a person up to capital punishment who carries a minimum 200 grams (7 oz) of ya ba.

Other countries
In February 2010 it was reported that increasingly large quantities of ya ba were being smuggled into Israel by Thai migrant workers, leading to fears that its use would spread to the Israeli club scene, where ecstasy use is already common. In the United States, it is occasionally also used as a club drug.

References

Further reading

External links
 New Drug Seeping into California Communities. The Associated Press, 22 September 2002
 Dhaka Police in "Huge" Drugs Haul. BBC News, 26 October 2007
 Everything You Need to Know About YABA. Culture Trip, 30 May 2017

Methamphetamine
Society of Thailand
Drugs in Thailand
Crime in Thailand
Caffeine
Polysubstance combinations